Olsen-banden Junior is a 2001 Danish family-comedy heist film. It is a prequel to the long running Danish film series Olsen-banden, and an implementation of the concept used by the Swedish Olsen-banden remakes prequels Lilla Jönssonligan. The film is also a sequel to the Christmas calendar Olsen-bandens første kup from 1999. The film premiered on December 14, 2001. The film was a moderate success compared to the original series and the Swedish and Norwegian equivalents. The film later received a novelization of the same name.

Plot
In the year of 1958, Egon Olsen, the child genius, tries to escape the orphanage where he lives by setting himself up to be adopted by a rich couple. Problems arise when it turns out that the couple are rocket scientists who want to use him as a test subject to be sent into space.

Cast
 Aksel Leth as Egon Olsen
 Christian Stoltenberg as Benny
 Jacob A. Bernit as Kjeld
 Signe Lerche as Yvonne
 Sebastian Jessen]as Kenneth
 Jesper Langberg as Hallandsen
 Ellen Hillingsø as Doctor Rakowski
 Christina Stojanovich as Inge-Margrethe
 Henrik Lykkegaard as Holm
 Claus Bue as Crime Assistant Jensen
 Claus Ryskjær as Manager
 Ole Thestrup as Major Schröder
 Lasse Lunderskov as Wasteman
 Henning Sprogøe as Mister Olsen

Reception

The film was released on home video by June 2002. It premiered on television on April 2, 2003. After the film there were more Junior installments in the Olsen-banden franchise and the next films are animated.

References

External links

2001 films
2000s children's comedy films
2000s Danish-language films
Danish children's films
Films directed by Peter Flinth
Prequel films
Olsen-banden films
Danish prequel films